Propantodice grisea is a species of beetle in the family Cerambycidae, and the only species in the genus Propantodice. It was described by Franz in 1954.

References 

Aerenicini
Beetles described in 1954
Monotypic beetle genera